Yahritza y Su Esencia are a trio from Washington State's Yakima Valley who specialize in Mexican regional music and ranchera. The band includes three siblings: singer and songwriter Yahritza Martínez, Armando (Mando) Martínez playing the requinto, and Jairo Martínez playing bajoloche (a form of bass).

For the week of April 9, 2022, their song "Soy el Único" appeared on the Billboard Global 200.  Yahritza wrote the song when she was only fourteen. At the 23rd Annual Latin Grammy Awards, the trio was nominated for Best New Artist as well as for Best Norteño Album for Obsessed, their debut album.

Discography

Extended plays

Singles

As lead artist

Promotional singles

Awards and Nominations

Notes

References 

Musical groups from Washington (state)
People from Yakima, Washington
Musical groups with year of establishment missing
Ranchera singers